The Thunder River Trail is a hiking trail on the North Rim of the Grand Canyon National Park, located in the U.S. state of Arizona.

Description

History
The upper portions of the trail were originally built in 1876 when rumors of placer gold led speculators to need a way into the area. Further trail work was performed beginning in 1925 under the US Forest Service and continued under the National Park Service with the final sections to Tapeats Creek completed in 1939. The trail was closed to all motorized vehicles effective July 1, 1962 due to safety concerns for both vehicle riders and hikers.

References

See also
 The Grand Canyon
 List of trails in Grand Canyon National Park

External links

 Grand Canyon Explorer
 Grand Canyon National Park

Hiking trails in Grand Canyon National Park
Grand Canyon, North Rim
Grand Canyon, North Rim (west)